The Lolas' Beautiful Show is a Philippine television comedy talk show broadcast by GMA Network. Hosted by Wally Bayola, Jose Manalo and Paolo Ballesteros, it premiered on September 25, 2017 on the network's afternoon line up replacing Trops. The show concluded on February 2, 2018 with a total of 95 episodes.

Premise
A spin-off of Kalyeserye segment of Eat Bulaga! as Bayola, Manalo and Ballesteros reprise their roles as Nidora Zobeyala, Tinidora Zobeyala and Tidora Zobeyala respectively.

Ratings
According to AGB Nielsen Philippines' Nationwide Urban Television Audience Measurement People in television homes, the pilot episode of The Lola's Beautiful Show earned a 4.4% rating. While the final episode scored a 3.5% rating.

References

External links
 

2017 Philippine television series debuts
2018 Philippine television series endings
Filipino-language television shows
GMA Network original programming
Philippine television talk shows
Television series by TAPE Inc.
Television spin-offs